trans-Dichlorobis(ethylenediamine)cobalt(III) chloride is a salt with the formula [CoCl2(en)2]Cl (en = ethylenediamine). It is a green diamagnetic solid that is soluble in water. It is the monochloride salt of the cationic coordination complex [CoCl2(en)2]+.  One chloride ion in this salt readily undergoes ion exchange but the two other chlorides are less reactive, being bound to the metal center. The more stable trans-dichlorobis(ethylenediamine)cobalt(III) chloride is also known.

Synthesis
The compound is synthesized by the reaction of cobalt(II) chloride and ethylenediamine in hydrochloric acid in the presence of oxygen:
4 CoCl2 + 8 en + 4 HCl + O2 → 4 trans-[CoCl2(en)2]Cl + 2 H2O

The initial product contains HCl, which is removed by heating. Alternatively, (carbonato)bis(ethylenediamine)cobalt(III) chloride reacts with hydrochloric acid at 10 °C to give the same species.
[Co(CO3)(en)2]Cl + 2 HCl → trans-[CoCl2(en)2]Cl + CO2 + H2O

Comparison of cis and trans isomers
This salt is more soluble than the cis isomer. This pair of isomers was significant in the development of the area of coordination chemistry.

The trans isomer cation has idealized D2h point group symmetry, whereas the cis isomer cation has C2 symmetry.

References

Chlorides
Chloro complexes
Cobalt complexes
Cobalt(III) compounds
Ethylenediamine complexes
Metal halides